"Some Hearts Are Diamonds" is a song by English soft rock musician Chris Norman, released as a single in 1986. The song is the title track off of his 1986 album of the same name. The song, produced and written by Dieter Bohlen, one half of Modern Talking, was a top 20 hit in Austria, Switzerland and Germany, peaking at numbers 7, 12 and 14, respectively. It is also a radio hit in the Philippines, with several stations playing it.

References

1986 songs
1986 singles
Chris Norman songs
Hansa Records singles
Songs written by Dieter Bohlen
Song recordings produced by Dieter Bohlen